Ivan Vitalevich Strebkov (born July 27, 1991) is a Russian professional basketball player for Nizhny Novgorod of the VTB United League.

Professional career
Strebkov started his professional career in CSKA Moscow back in 2012. On January 3, 2013, Strebkov was sent on loan to Avtodor Saratov for the rest of the season. On July 25, 2013, CSKA Moscow decided to Strebkov keep playing for Avtador Saratov in the upcoming season. He signed with Nizhny Novgorod in 2015. He averaged 6.2 points per game during the 2019-20 season and re-signed with the club on June 30, 2020.

References

External links
 Ivan Strebkov at eurobasket.com
 Ivan Strebkov at vtb-league.com

1991 births
Living people
PBC CSKA Moscow players
BC Avtodor Saratov players
BC Nizhny Novgorod players
People from Almaty
Point guards
Russian men's basketball players